Brother Nature is a 2016 American comedy film directed by Osmany Rodriguez and Matt Villines, from a screenplay by Mikey Day, Cameron Fay, and Taran Killam. It stars Killam, Bobby Moynihan, Gillian Jacobs, Rita Wilson and Bill Pullman. The film was released in a limited release and through video on demand on September 9, 2016, by Insurge Pictures and Samuel Goldwyn Films.

The film was originally titled Brother in Laws.

Cast
 Taran Killam as Roger Fellner 
 Bobby Moynihan as Todd Dotchman 
 Gillian Jacobs as Gwen Turley 
 Rita Wilson as Cathy Turley 
 Bill Pullman as Jerry Turley 
 Kumail Nanjiani as Riggleman 
 Kenan Thompson as Miesha 
 Rachael Harris as Aunt Pam 
 Sarah Burns as Margie Turley 
 Sarah Baker as Shannon
 David Wain as Uncle Mel 
 Ellen Bloodworth as Grandma Hibby 
 Giancarlo Esposito as Congressman Frank McClaren 
 Jonah Kellams as Cousin Cody
 Ethan Harmon as Cousin Spencer 
 Julian F. Grijalva as George Washington
 Mikey Day as Thomas Jefferson
 Tim Robinson as Ben Franklin
 Sam Grey as John Adams
 Noor Shic as Riggleman's Mom 
 Mike O'Brien as Nick 
 Aidy Bryant as Dana Curlman
 Benny Morinishi as Micah

Production
In August 2014, it was announced Taran Killam, Bill Pullman, Rachael Harris, Rita Wilson, David Wain, and Bobby Moynihan had joined the cast of the film, with Matt Villines and Osmany Rodriguez directing from a screenplay by Killam, Cameron Fay, and Mikey Day, and Lorne Michaels serving as producer under his Broadway Video banner.

Release
The film was released in a limited release and through video on demand on September 9, 2016.

References

External links
 
 

2016 films
American comedy films
American independent films
Films shot in Oregon
Samuel Goldwyn Films films
2010s English-language films
Films set in Oregon
Films set on lakes
2010s American films